The Sukhoi T-3 was a prototype Soviet fighter aircraft.

Development
Starting in the early 1950s, the development of the T-3 proceeded in parallel with the S-1 which would eventually become the Sukhoi Su-7. While the S-1 was a conventional swept wing aircraft (S stood for strelovidniy, стреловидный, swept wing), the T-3 had a delta wing with a leading edge sweep of 57° (T stood for treugolniy, треугольный, delta wing). Aside from the wings, the two aircraft shared the basic design as well as the Lyulka AL-7 turbojet engine. Since the T-3 was intended to be an interceptor, it was fitted with the Almaz (Алмаз, Diamond) radar housed in the air intake. The prototype first flew on 26 May 1956.

The T-3 was ordered into production at Factory No.153 but events overtook it when a revised specification was issued for the Interceptor fighter role. Three aircraft were completed and transported by rail to the OKB-51 factory near Moscow, where only one was to fly in as-built condition and all three prototypes were modified for various test programmes, becoming, for example, the T-39, T-49, PT-7, PT-8 and other experimental aircraft. To investigate different radar radome configurations as well as develop radar and missile sub-systems, two of the prototypes were converted to become the PT-7 and PT-8. The PT-7 had a variable intake ramp, while the PT-8 had an extended nose with a translating centerbody. Although not proceeded with, the T-3 served as the basis for what would eventually become the Sukhoi Su-9, forming the backbone of the PVO during the 1960s.

Specifications (T-3)

See also

References

Further reading

Gordon, Yefim. Sukhoi Interceptors. Hinkley, Midland. 2004. 
Gunston, Bill. The Osprey Encyclopaedia of Russian Aircraft 1875–1995. London, Osprey. 1995. 
Green, William. "The Great Book of Fighters". 2001. MBI Publishing.

T-3
1950s Soviet fighter aircraft
Abandoned military aircraft projects of the Soviet Union
Delta-wing aircraft
Single-engined jet aircraft
Aircraft first flown in 1956